The following lists events that happened during 1946 in the Imperial State of Iran.

Incumbents
 Shah: Mohammad Reza Pahlavi 
 Prime Minister: Ebrahim Hakimi (until January 28), Ahmad Qavam (starting January 28)

Events

January
 January 19 – The United Nations Security Council took up a formal by Iran against the Soviet Union, for the Soviet occupation of Iranian Azerbaijan.
 January 22 – A Kurdish nation, the Republic of Mahabad, was proclaimed in the north of Iran by Qazi Muhammad, who became President.
 January 26 – Ahmad Qavam was elected by the Majlis of Iran as the new Prime Minister with a vote of 51.

References

 
Iran
Years of the 20th century in Iran
1940s in Iran
Iran